Colombia competed at the 1964 Summer Olympics in Tokyo, Japan. 20 competitors, all men, took part in 19 events in 6 sports.

Athletics

Cycling

Eight cyclists represented Colombia in 1964.

Individual road race
 Martín Rodríguez
 Pablo Hernández
 Rubén Darío Gómez
 Mario Escobar

Team time trial
 Rubén Darío Gómez
 Pablo Hernández
 Javier Suárez
 Pedro Sánchez

Sprint
 Mario Vanegas
 Eduardo Bustos

1000m time trial
 Eduardo Bustos

Individual pursuit
 Martín Rodríguez

Diving

Fencing

Five fencers, all men, represented Colombia in 1964.

Men's foil
 Ignacio Posada
 Emilio Echeverry
 Dibier Tamayo

Men's team foil
 Ignacio Posada, Dibier Tamayo, Emilio Echeverry, Ernesto Sastre, Humberto Posada

Men's épée
 Dibier Tamayo
 Ernesto Sastre
 Emilio Echeverry

Men's team épée
 Emilio Echeverry, Ernesto Sastre, Dibier Tamayo, Humberto Posada

Men's sabre
 Ignacio Posada
 Emilio Echeverry
 Humberto Posada

Shooting

One shooter represented Colombia in 1964.

25 m pistol
 Álvaro Clopatofsky

Swimming

See also
Sports in Colombia

References

External links
Official Olympic Reports

Nations at the 1964 Summer Olympics
1964
Oly